Aquilops is an early herbivorous ceratopsian dinosaur dating from the Early Cretaceous of North America, approximately 109 million to 104 million years ago. The type species is A. americanus.

Description

The skull is 84.2 mm long. The holotype is possibly not from a full-grown individual. A comparison with related species indicates it might have been at 60% of its adult length. Wedel estimated the total body length of Aquilops at 60 cm and its weight at 1.5 kg.

The authors established some unique traits. The rostral, the bone core of the snout beak, curves downwards and has an arched keel on its top with a bump on the front. In front of the tooth row the upper jaw rim is over its total length concave in side view. The skull opening, the antorbital fenestra, is twice as long as it is tall and has a pointed rear, below the eye socket.

Discovery and naming
 
In 1997, paleontologist Scott Madsen found the single fossil, a partial skull, in Carbon County in southern Montana. While preparing the specimen, at first assumed to be of Zephyrosaurus, he discovered that it was a species new to science.

In 2014 the type species Aquilops americanus was named and described by Andrew Farke, W. Desmond Maxwell, Richard L. Cifelli, and Matt J. Wedel. The generic name is derived from Latin aquila, "eagle", and Greek ὤψ, ops, "face", in reference to the beaked snout. The specific name americanus refers to the fact that the species represents the first unequivocal very basal neoceratopsian found in America.

The holotype, OMNH 34557, was found in a layer of the Cloverly Formation, dating from the middle-late Albian. It consists of a skull with lower jaws, of a subadult individual. The rear of the head and the palate are the main lacking parts.  The specimen was found during a 1997 expedition supported by the National Geographic Society and directed by Cifelli.

Classification

 
Aquilops was placed in the Neoceratopsia. A cladistic analysis showed that it was positioned rather basal, below Leptoceratops in the evolutionary tree, with only Liaoceratops being more basal. A more derived position, e.g. as a leptoceratopsid or a protoceratopsid, was less likely; it was improbable that it was a ceratopsoid. The fact that the holotype was a subadult might have distorted these results because juvenile individuals often show basal traits. However, after correcting for traits that might change during ontogeny, the resulting tree was basically the same. The ceratopsians more derived than psittacosaurids, called neoceratopsians, evolved in Asia: the presence of a basal neoceratopsian in North America was seen as an indication for a late Early Cretaceous migration event, the ancestors of Aquilops invading from Asia. Two later such events would have occurred in the early Late Cretaceous.

See also
 2014 in paleontology
Neoceratopsia
 Timeline of ceratopsian research

References

External links
The Sam Noble Museum - Interactive 3d models of Aquilops skull and dinosaur.

Ceratopsians
Ornithischian genera
Early Cretaceous dinosaurs of North America
Taxa named by Matt J. Wedel
Cloverly fauna
Paleontology in Montana
Fossil taxa described in 2014